Schistura acuticephala is a species of ray-finned fish in the stone loach genus Schistura. It occurs in the basin of the Irrawaddy River in Myanmar.

References 

acuticeps
Fish described in 1929